Kathryn Apanowicz (born 3 June 1960) is a British actress and presenter. Apanowicz grew up in Horsforth, Leeds, with a brother, Stephen. Her father was a Polish RAF pilot in the Second World War. She first became involved with television at the age of eight when she presented a junior-aimed programme on ITV, before joining Calendar and then turning to acting.

Apanowicz is best known for her 1980s television appearances in the BBC soap operas, Angels, where she played Nurse Rose Butchins, and EastEnders, where she played the caterer Magda Czajkowski. She has also had minor roles in Emmerdale and Coronation Street, and, as a child, appeared in the film Bugsy Malone. Before being cast in these shows, Apanowicz had worked in children's programmes for Yorkshire Television with Mark Curry.

In the early 1990s she presented talk-based magazine programme Afternoon Live for cable channel Wire TV. In 2000, she enjoyed a regular stint as one of the presenters of ITV1's daytime magazine show for women, Live Talk. She is both a presenter for BBC Radio Leeds, and a guest presenter for BBC Radio York.

From 1994 to 2005, Apanowicz was the partner of Countdown host Richard Whiteley. After his death, she published a biography of Whiteley titled Richard by Kathryn. Apanowicz donated three pairs of Whiteley's spectacles to optical charity Vision Aid Overseas (VAO), who sent them with a team of optical professionals to Ethiopia, where they were fitted to three locals with the same prescription. The BBC followed this story on their Inside Out programme which was broadcast on 19 September 2007.

Apanowicz became friends with Whiteley's Countdown co-host Carol Vorderman. In July 2008, Apanowicz made numerous appearances in the British media lambasting Channel 4 bosses for their refusal to negotiate an acceptable pay deal with Vorderman, which had resulted in her departure from the show.

References

External links

1960 births
Living people
People from Horsforth
English people of Polish descent
English soap opera actresses
English television presenters
English radio personalities
People educated at St. Joseph's Catholic College, Bradford